The Nuremberg–Augsburg railway is a 137 km long main line in the German state of Bavaria. Most of it follows two parts the historic Ludwig South-North Railway, one of the oldest lines in Germany.  Today, even after the opening of the high-speed line from Nuremberg to Munich via Ingolstadt, is still used for long-distance services. It is also used as a detour during closures of the high speed line for maintenance. Between Nuremberg and Roth S-Bahn services run on the parallel Nuremberg–Roth line.

History
The first plans for a railway line from Augsburg to Nuremberg were made shortly after the opening of the first railway line in Germany, the Nuremberg–Fürth line in 1835. Merchants from the Augsburg area formed a joint-stock company for the construction and operation of a line from Augsburg to Nuremberg via Donauwörth and Treuchtlingen. The company was dissolved in 1841 because it was understood that King Ludwig I intended to build a state railway and because the company had decided that the difficult geography between Donauwörth and Treuchtlingen (the Franconian Alb) made it impossible to build and operate a railway economically.

The Bavarian state government handled the problem of crossing the Franconian Alb by routing the Ludwig South-North Railway through the Nordlinger Ries depression. Therefore, only the Augsburg–Donauwörth and Pleinfeld–Nuremberg sections of the Nuremberg–Augsburg were part of the South-North Railway, which was authorised by the Bavarian parliament on 25 August 1843. The Treuchtlingen–Pleinfeld section was built in connection with the construction of the Ingolstadt–Treuchtlingen line and opened on 2 October 1869. The gap between Donauwörth and Treuchtlingen was not completed until 1 October 1906, when more advanced steam engines made the operation of the hilly line more economic.

On 1 October 1898, the flying junction between Nuremberg suburbs of Eibach and Reichelsdorf was opened, allowing a grade-separated entrance for freight trains to the Nuremberg marshalling yard. Work on the electrification of the line began in 1933 and was completed on 10 May 1935.

The 36.5 km section between Augsburg-Oberhausen and Donauwörth was cleared in two sections in 1978 and 1981 for speeds of up to 200 km/h. This was one of the first lines in Germany, where this speed was authorised.

On 29 June 1994, a ground breaking ceremony was held for the beginning of the rebuilding of the section from Nuremberg Hauptbahnhof to Roth for S-Bahn operations, which was completed on 9 June 2001.

The overhead wiring of the line, mostly dating from 1935, was renewed between 2004 and 2006.

Opening dates
20 November 1844 (Oberhausen–Nordheim)
1 July 1847 (Augsburg–Oberhausen)
15 September 1847 (Nordheim–Donauwörth)
1 April 1849 (Nuremberg–Schwabach)
1 October 1849 (Schwabach–Pleinfeld)
2 October 1869 (Treuchtlingen–Pleinfeld)
1 October 1906 (Donauwörth–Treuchtlingen)

Testing and record runs
On 17 October 1984, locomotive 120001-3 hauled a train of three carriages (trailing load: 250 t) between Donauwörth and Augsburg at 265 km/h, a world record for a three-phase-powered train.

In 1993, a trial of new air-sprung bogies for Intercity Express trains achieved a speed of 333 km/h between Augsburg and Donauwörth.

Route
The route leaves Nuremberg Hauptbahnhof, initially running parallel with the lines to Crailsheim, Bamberg and Würzburg, running to the west. It passes under the Frankenschnellweg freeway and then makes a long turn to the south. It passes through the districts of Sandreuth, Schweinau and Werderau and then crosses the South-west Tangent (Südwesttangente) freeway, the Rhine–Main–Danube Canal and the Ring line, where there is an extensive system of connecting lines and reaches the flying junction between the stations of Eibach and Reichelsdorf, which are now stations for the S-Bahn only. The flying junction allows the S-Bahn tracks to switch from the west of the main line tracks to the east. In addition, the south main line track switches to the right, as trains have been running on the left since Nuremberg Hauptbahnhof, unusually for Germany.

The line runs through the Nuremberg districts of Reichelsdorf, Reichelsdorfer Keller and Katzwang and the Schwabach districts of Limbach and Waldsiedlung, crosses the Rednitz and Schwabach rivers and finally reaches Schwabach station. The line makes a turn to the left and then runs parallel to the Rednitz through Rednitzhembach and via Roth to Georgensgmünd and from there parallel to Federal Highway 2 and the Rezat river to Pleinfeld. In Roth, the line to Hilpoltstein (also known as the Greding Railway, Gredlbahn) branches off. Until 1995, a line branched from Georgensgmünd to Spalt. Another branch, known as the Lakeland Railway (Seenlandbahn), as it passes through the Franconian Lake District, connects Pleinfeld with Gunzenhausen; it was part of the original Ludwig South-North Railway. The line continues to the Baroque town of Ellingen and Weißenburg, which was established on a Roman settlement. North of Weißenburg the line crosses the Swabian Rezat river. Just before the railway junction in Treuchtlingen with the lines from Wurzburg and to Ingolstadt, the line crosses the remnants of the ancient Fossa Carolina canal and the Altmühl river.

After Treuchtlingen the line runs south up the Möhren valley and through the Franconian Alb to the railway junction of Donauwörth, where the Ries Railway connects to Nördlingen and the Ingolstadt–Neuoffingen railway (Danube Valley Railway) connects to Ingolstadt and Ulm. Formerly there were several stations in the Alb, but they have now largely been closed and dismantled. Only Otting-Weilheim is still served by regional trains; Mündling is still used for operational purposes. Fünfstetten, which was once a junction to a branch line to Monheim, is currently only rarely used or only as a siding. The line crosses the Wörnitz shortly before Donauwörth, and shortly afterwards crosses the Danube and the Zusam and then runs parallel to the Lech. At Mertingen the line used to meet a branch line to Wertingen, and at Herbertshofen and Gablingen there are industrial sidings. After Gersthofen, the line crosses the A8 autobahn and Federal Highway 2 and then joins the Ulm–Augsburg line to run through Augsburg-Oberhausen station, cross the Wertach river and the Augsburg Local Railway and finally reach Augsburg Hauptbahnhof.

Development
The route is double track and electrified throughout. Between Nuremberg and Roth the line runs parallel with the one or two-track Nuremberg-Roth S-Bahn line. In addition, between Nuremberg station and Reichelsdorf trains run on the left, to facilitate connections with the Nuremberg ring line.

The projected Augsburg S-Bahn would involve the upgrading of the Meitingen–Augsburg Hbf section to three tracks. Detailed planning and funding of the project have not been completed. A decision to go forward with the project is not expected before 2015.

The first Federal Transport Infrastructure Plan of 1973 identified a high-speed line between Würzburg and Augsburg via Nuremberg as one of eight development projects. The line was listed as the Würzburg–Augsburg high-speed railway line in the Coordinated Investment Program of the Federal Transport Infrastructure Plan of 1977. It was also identified as being an urgent priority in the Federal Transport Infrastructure Plan of 1985.

Transport associations
The line is operated as Regionalbahn line R6 or R64 from Nuremberg to Otting-Weilheim by the Greater Nuremberg Transport Association (Verkehrsverbund Großraum Nürnberg, VGN) and as Regionalbahn line R4 from Otting-Weilheim to Augsburg by the Augsburg Transport Association (Augsburger Verkehrsverbund, AVV).

Operations

Intercity Express and Intercity trains operate long-distance services over the line.

The northern section from Nuremberg to Treuchtlingen is served hourly by Regional-Express trains that continue every two hours alternately via Ingolstadt to Munich or Augsburg. These are usually operated by Class 111 electric locomotives, hauling five double-deck carriages. Since December 2006, a Modus-Wagen train set has also been used. South of Treuchtlingen there is an additional regional express service, which combined with the two-hourly service from Nuremberg, provides an hourly service. This service is operated by push-pull trains, hauled by class 110 or 111 locomotives.

Between Donauwörth and Augsburg there is also an hourly Regionalbahn service, which continues every two hours to Munich. The services running only between Donauwörth and Augsburg are operated with the class 440 electric multiple units, the services continuing to Munich were operated by locomotive-hauled double-deck sets until December 2009.

Since the timetable change on 10 December 2006, a direct link between Nuremberg and Lindau has been operated under the name of Allgäu-Franken-Express, using diesel multiple units of class 612 because of the section between Augsburg and Lindau is not electrified. Four pairs of trains operate each day on the route, stopping in Treuchtlingen and Donauwörth, and provide along with some ICE and IC trains, fast connections between Augsburg and Nuremberg.

Sources

Notes

References

External links 

Railway lines in Bavaria
Rail transport in Nuremberg
Rail transport in Augsburg
Railway lines opened in 1844
1844 establishments in Bavaria
Buildings and structures in Roth (district)
Schwabach
Buildings and structures in Weißenburg-Gunzenhausen
Buildings and structures in Donau-Ries
Buildings and structures in Augsburg (district)